The A Vlaicu I was the first powered airplane built by Aurel Vlaicu.

Design and development
After flying his glider in Binţinţi, Aurel Vlaicu moved to the Kingdom of Romania.

On November 1, 1909, he began the construction of his first powered airplane, the A. Vlaicu Nr. I at the Army Arsenal in Bucharest.  The Romanian Ministry of War provided an initial grant of 2000 lei, and Minister of Public Education was paying Vlaicu a 300 lei monthly stipend.

The A. Vlaicu Nr. I flew for the first time on June 17, 1910, over Cotroceni airfield.

Military Commission Report 

Below are the minutes after aerial demonstrations held by Aurel Vlaicu in August 1910 before a military commission :

Underwriters assisting in day August 13, 1910, from flights performed by the airplane or engineer Vlaicu I agree to the following conclusions to be made to the Ministry of War, which subsidizes this engineer .

Signatures:

Captain (indecipherable)
Major (probably) Mihailov
Colonel D. Iliescu
General Georgescu

Operational history

On September 28, 1910, as a part of the Fall military exercises, Vlaicu flew his airplane from Slatina to Piatra Olt carrying a message, an early instance of an airplane being used for military purposes.

On October 17, 1910, he performed a demonstration flight on Băneasa hippodrome.

Operators
   Romanian Air Corps

Specifications (Military)

See also

 Aurel Vlaicu
 A Vlaicu II
 A Vlaicu III
 List of aircraft (pre-1914)

References

High-wing aircraft
Aurel Vlaicu
Aircraft first flown in 1910